Nee Varuvolam is a 1997 Indian Malayalam-language drama film directed by Sibi Malayil and written by G. A. Lal. It stars Dileep and Divya Unni in the lead roles.

Plot
The film is about how the life of a teacher changes after his sister gets raped by 2 men under disguise of police officers.

Cast
 Dileep as Hari
 Divya Unni as Revathi
 Thilakan as Madhavan Nair
 Jagathy Sreekumar as Manoharan Pilla
 Manju Pillai as Santha
 Roslin as Hari's mother
 Rekha Mohan as Sudha, Hari's elder sister
 Baby Ambili as Suja, Hari's younger sister
 Chali Pala
 Elias Babu as Revathy's father
 Ponnamma Babu as Revathy's mother	
 Ravi Vallathol as Chandrasekharan
 Indrans
 Sandeep as Raju, Revathi's brother

Soundtrack
The music has been given by Johnson, with lyrics by Gireesh Puthenchery.

References

External links

1994 films
1990s Malayalam-language films